Billy Besson (born 8 March 1981) is a French competitive sailor.

Besson was born in Papeete, French Polynesia where multihulls are central to the sailing culture. A child of Tahiti, he lived there with his family and learned to sail there.

World Champion on the Dart 18 and F18, Besson has also amassed four world championship titles in the Nacra 17, forming a dynamic duo with Marie Riou. The skipper's serious back injury deprived the pair of their chance to vie for the Olympic title in Rio 2016 but, with unfinished business, the pair went back campaigning for Tokyo 2020.
In 2018, whilst Riou was taking part in the Volvo Ocean Race, Besson was discovering offshore sailing for himself competing with two of France's most prestigious maxi-trimaran campaigns. (Sodebo with Thomas Coville / Banque Populaire with Armel le Cleac'h)

From 2018 to October 2021, Billy was part of SailGP, as the French skipper of Sail GP.

Participation in Olympics 
He competed at the 2016 Summer Olympics in Rio de Janeiro, in the mixed Nacra 17.The duo ended 6th.

References

External links 
 
 
 
 

1981 births
Living people
French male sailors (sport)
Olympic sailors of France
Sailors at the 2016 Summer Olympics – Nacra 17
Nacra 17 class world champions
World champions in sailing for France